William Christopher McColl (born 25 December 1954) is a retired Scottish footballer. He played as a midfielder for Clydebank, Ayr United, Clyde and Albion Rovers in the 1970s and 1980s, winning the Scottish Second Division title twice.

Early life
Billy McColl was born in the Shettleston area of Glasgow on 25 December 1954.

Playing career 

A product of the Glasgow youth team Drumchapel Amateurs, McColl began his senior career with Clydebank, signing for them as a 17-year-old in November 1972. He was a member of the squad that won the inaugural Second Division title in 1975-76 before going on to win promotion to the Premier Division a year later, the first time the club had appeared in the top flight of Scottish football. In 1976, McColl scored the opening goal of a 2–2 draw with St Mirren at Kilbowie Park in what was the last senior match in England or Scotland ever to be played on Christmas Day (also McColl's birthday). He would make over 150 Scottish League appearances for Clydebank before a transfer to Ayr United in 1978.

In 1981 McColl joined Clyde under the management of Craig Brown and won another Second Division championship medal in season 1981-82. His last senior club was Albion Rovers in 1983 where he made just a single league appearance before retiring.

After football

After leaving football, McColl went into business as a sub-postmaster and newsagent in Netherlee, East Renfrewshire. His son Barry McColl also played Scottish League football, for Queen's Park in the 1990s. In 2019, Billy McColl was inducted into the Clydebank F.C. Hall of Fame.

Honours 
Clydebank
 Scottish Second Division: 1975–76

Clyde
Scottish Second Division: 1981–82

References 

Living people
1954 births
Association football midfielders
Scottish footballers
Scottish Football League players
Clydebank F.C. (1965) players
Ayr United F.C. players
Clyde F.C. players
Albion Rovers F.C. players
Drumchapel Amateur F.C. players
Footballers from Glasgow